Not Now, I'll Tell You When is an album by pianist and bandleader Count Basie featuring tracks recorded in 1960 and originally released on the Roulette label.

Reception

AllMusic awarded the album 3 stars and its review by Scott Yanow states, "Because of the obscure repertoire, this is a fine LP for veteran Basie collectors. The band is in its usual swinging form".

Track listing
 "Not Now, I'll Tell You When" (Thad Jones, Count Basie) - 3:37
 "Rare Butterfly" (Frank Foster, Basie) - 4:32
 "Back to the Apple" (Foster, Basie) - 4:42
 "Ol' Man River" (Jerome Kern, Oscar Hammerstein II) - 4:52
 "Mama's Talkin' Soft" (Jules Styne, Stephen Sondheim) - 4:23
 "The Daly Jump" (Freddie Green, Basie) - 4:07
 "Blue on Blue" (Frank Wess, Basie) - 3:02
 "Swinging at the Waldorf" (Wess, Basie) - 3:40
 "Sweet and Purty" (Jones, Basie) - 3:26

Personnel 
Count Basie - piano
Sonny Cohn, Thad Jones, Joe Newman, Snooky Young - trumpet
Henry Coker, Al Grey, Benny Powell - trombone
Marshal Royal - alto saxophone, clarinet
Frank Wess - alto saxophone, tenor saxophone, flute
Frank Foster, Billy Mitchell - tenor saxophone
Charlie Fowlkes - baritone saxophone
Freddie Green - guitar
Eddie Jones - bass
Sonny Payne - drums

References 

1960 albums
Count Basie Orchestra albums
Roulette Records albums